Elizabeth Davenport (born October 1, 1938) is an Indian athlete. She won a silver  medal  in the 1958 Tokyo Asian games and bronze medal in 1962 Jakarta Asian games in  Javelin Throw .

References

Indian female javelin throwers
Athletes (track and field) at the 1958 British Empire and Commonwealth Games
Athletes (track and field) at the 1958 Asian Games
Athletes (track and field) at the 1962 Asian Games
Asian Games silver medalists for India
Asian Games bronze medalists for India
Asian Games medalists in athletics (track and field)
Medalists at the 1958 Asian Games
Medalists at the 1962 Asian Games
Commonwealth Games competitors for India